Gays Creek is an unincorporated community in Perry County, Kentucky, United States. Gays Creek has a post office, established in 1888, with ZIP code 41745.

The community was named in honor of Henry Gay, a local Revolutionary War veteran who died in 1830.

References

Unincorporated communities in Perry County, Kentucky
Unincorporated communities in Kentucky
1888 establishments in Kentucky